The King Cadillac GMC Throwback 100 was a NASCAR K&N Pro Series East race that took place at Thompson Speedway Motorsports Park in Thompson, Connecticut. The race adopted its "throwback" format in 2017. On June 4, 2019, NASCAR announced the cancellation of the 2019 event. Ricky Craven had the most triumphs of any driver, winning the event three times.

Past winners

 1990 (1 of 2), 1993, 2004, 2005, 2007: race extended due to overtime.
 1996 (1 of 2): race shortened due to rain.

References

External links
 Thompson Speedway Motorsports Park
 

Thompson, Connecticut
Buildings and structures in Windham County, Connecticut
1988 establishments in Connecticut
Recurring sporting events established in 1988